Cooladdi is a ghost town and rural locality in the Shire of Murweh, Queensland, Australia.

Claims have been made that Cooladdi is Australia's smallest town by population. In 2015, the population was 3 (down from 4 in 2013), all of whom lived at the general store.

Geography 
The town is in the centre of the locality. The Western railway line passes from east to west through the town and locality. The locality was served by a number of railway stations (from east to west):

 Nimaru railway station (now abandoned)
 Coothalla railway station
 Loddon railway station (now abandoned)
Cooladdi railway station serving the town

Yalamurra railway station (now abandoned)

The Diamantina Developmental Road (which forms part of the 1578 kilometre (980 mi) Warrego Way State Strategic Touring Route between Brisbane and Birdsville) also passes from east to west through the town and locality.

History 
Gunya (also known as Kunya, Kunja, Kurnja) is an Australian Aboriginal language spoken by the Gunya people. The Gunya language region includes the landscape within the local government boundaries of the Paroo Shire Council, taking in Cunnamulla and extending north towards Augathella, east towards Bollon and west towards Thargomindah.

The railway station was originally called Yarronvale after a local pastoral station with the town taking its name from the railway station. However, it was renamed in 1913 to Cooladdi, an Aboriginal word meaning black duck, to avoid confusion with the pastoral station, which was 15 miles away.

Cooladdi was a railhead for the local pastoral community. At one time, Cooladdi had a school, post office, and police station with a population of about 270 people. As the railway line extended further west, Cooladdi's role and population declined.

The Cooladdi State School originally opened on 19 March 1926 as a Provisional School with 9 students under teacher A.W. Marsh. In 1933, a new school building was constructed and the school redesignated as a State School. The school closed on 3 May 1974. It was located opposite the railway station on Cooladdi Acess Road.

In 2015, the population was 3 (down from 4 in 2013), all of whom resided at the general store.

Education
There are no schools in Cooladi. The nearest government primary and secondary schools Charleville State School and Charleville State High School respectively both in Charleville to the north-east. However, only those living in the east of the locality would be within daily commuting range. Other options are distance education and boarding schools.

Economy
There are a number of homesteads in the locality:
 Allambie
 Auburn Vale
 Auburn Vale
 Bodouna
 Boin
 Coolabah
 Coolabah
 Cooladdi Park
 Cungella
 Glenallen
 Inkerman
 Loddon
 Merigol
 Monamby
 Mount Pleasant
 Nimboy
 Weaner Creek
 Wooyenong
 Yarronvale

References

Further reading

External links 
 

Ghost towns in Queensland
Shire of Murweh
Localities in Queensland